Phaonia consobrina is a species of fly which is widely distributed across the Palaearctic.

References

Muscidae
Diptera of Europe
Insects described in 1838
Taxa named by Johan Wilhelm Zetterstedt